William West (July 15, 1887 – September 15, 1953) was an American equestrian. He competed in three events at the 1920 Summer Olympics.

References

1887 births
1953 deaths
American male equestrians
Olympic equestrians of the United States
Equestrians at the 1920 Summer Olympics
People from Harris County, Georgia